Joolz Denby (born Julianne Mumford 9 April 1955, previously known simply as Joolz) is a poet, novelist, artist and tattooist based in Bradford, West Yorkshire, England.

Early life
Born to an Army family at Colchester Barracks in Essex, England, Julianne Mumford moved with her parents to Harrogate, North Yorkshire at age 11. While a pupil at Harrogate Ladies' College, she started to hang around with local bikers at age 15, although she was more interested in the mechanical side of motorcycles than becoming a biker-chick.

In 1975, at age 19, she married Kenneth Denby, who wanted to be a "prospect" or probationary member of the Bradford chapter of the  Satans Slaves Motorcycle Club. In an interview with the BBC in 2005, she described her time as a Satans Slave associate as: "It was very difficult. We didn't have a very good relationship with the police. If anything happened you knew you would immediately get the blame. There were only certain places you could go. We had a lot of power on the streets so I was Little Queen — I just went where I liked and did what I liked because I had a lot of protection. We had a lot of power but you were definitely marked out. Bike culture is very hierarchic and patriarchal so obviously I wasn't in the Satan Slaves. My husband was in the Satan Slaves. I was married to him and that's quite a distinction. As a woman you can't be in those gangs."

Disillusioned with the strict regimentation and controls associated with membership of a biker group and particularly rebellious against those exercised over WAGs of the male bikers and the expected-conformity which she encountered during four years' association with the Slaves, she dyed her hair pink, broke her ties to the Slaves and later started working as a bouncer during the embryonic punk scene of the late 1970s at the Queen's Hall, Bradford.

She then started attending a local poetry-reading group and organised public events for a local group Poetry in Motion. Stepping in for an absent member, she gained her first experience of public speaking.

Professional career

Known simply as Joolz, Denby is a poet, novelist, artist, illustrator, and professional tattooist. She first came to prominence as a touring punk performance poet. She does not consider herself a 'performance poet'; instead, she designates herself a "spoken-word artist" as she considers that title more accurate.

Denby often co-performs at musical venues and has been a regular at music festivals such as Roskilde, Reading and at Glastonbury Festival (where she historically performed in the Theatre and Cabaret Marquees) as well as art and literature festivals in other countries. She began recording music singles and spoken word recordings -in 1983 sometimes solo, but usually in collaboration with musicians Jah Wobble, the underground cult band New Model Army, New Model Army's singer/songwriter Justin Sullivan, and singer/songwriter Mik Davis.

Denby is also a visual artist, a professional tattoo artist with her own studio in Bradford and her photographs have been exhibited. She designed merchandise for New Model Army, New York Alcoholic Anxiety Attack, Monster Jaw and Utopian Love Revival, and created sleeve art. Her exhibition on the theme of elective body modification, 'The Body Carnival', ran from 30 October until 30 November 2008 at Cartwright Hall, Bradford and is held in the gallery's store as a touring exhibition.

Denby has published poetry collections and novels. She continues to perform regularly at live venues and appears on television and radio. She has also recorded a number of unabridged audiobooks, including two recordings of her own novels (one of which, Stone Baby, won the US Audio Industry 'Earphone Award'). Denby also managed the band 'New York Alcoholic Anxiety Attack' and latterly works with 'Utopian Love Revival' with whom she also has a side-project, 'Death By Rock 'N' Roll' featuring live performances of her poetry set to rock music written for her by the band. Denby worked on the screenplay project "Exilée" and "Secret Angles" with film maker Nemo Sandman and produced poetry for Bradford Council as part of the city's bid for 2008 Capital of Culture. She wrote poems 'Northlands', commissioned by Yorkshire Forward for their Regional Economic Strategy Document, and for the Royal Armouries, the Captain Cook Museum in Whitby and Alchemy Asian Arts. In 2006 Denby was designated a Cultural Revolutionary by the Northern arts festival 'Illuminate' for her contribution to the region's arts and the cultural life of her home city of Bradford, and received an honorary doctorate from the University of Bradford in recognition of her role as a cultural ambassador.

Denby won the Crime Writers' Association Debut Dagger award for her first novel, Stone Baby. The CWA also nominated the novel for a John Creasey Memorial Dagger prize for best first crime novel. Her third novel, Billie Morgan, based on some of her experiences in the biker subculture of the 1970s, made the shortlist for the 2005 Orange Prize. Denby's fifth collection of poetry Pray for Us Sinners (Comma Press) was published in 2006 and her fourth novel, Borrowed Light was published in February 2006 by Serpent's Tail). In 2010 she set up an independent publishing house 'Ignite Books' alongside poet Steve Pottinger which published her novels A True Account of the Curious Mystery of Miss Lydia Larkin & The Widow Marvell (2011) and Wild Thing (2012).

Works

Collections of poetry and short stories

 Mad, Bad, & Dangerous to Know (Virgin Books, 1986)
 Emotional Terrorism (Bloodaxe Books, 1990)
 The Pride of Lions (Bloodaxe Books, (1994)
 Errors of the Spirit (Flambard Press 2000)
 Pray for Us Sinners (Comma Press, 2005)

Novels

 Stone Baby, (HarperCollins, 2000)
 Corazon, (HarperCollins, 2001)
 Billie Morgan, (Serpent's Tail, 2004)
 Borrowed Light, (Serpent's Tail, 2006)
 A True Account of the Curious Mystery of Miss Lydia Larkin & The Widow Marvell (Ignite Books 2011)
 Wild Thing (Ignite Books 2012)

Discography

 Love Is (Sweet Romance) (EP with music by New Model Army) EMI, 1985
 Mad, Bad and Dangerous to Know (EP with music by New Model Army) EMI, 1986
 Hex (music by New Model Army) EMI, 1990
 Weird Sister (music by Justin Sullivan) Intercord Records, 1991
 Joolz 1983–1985 (compilation of Abstract Records material with music by Jah Wobble, Justin Sullivan and other musicians, collecting her first audio recordings) Abstract Records, 1993 
 Red Sky Coven, Volumes 1&2 (live collective recording of Red Sky Coven, with Joolz on some of the tracks) Attack Attack Records: 1995
 True North (music by Justin Sullivan) Wooltown Records, 1995 or 1997
 Red Sky Coven, Volume 3 Attack Attack Records: 1999
 Spirit Stories (poetry set to music by Justin Sullivan) Attack Attack Records: 2008
 Red Sky Coven 5 Attack Attack Records: 2009
 The Black Dahlia (poetry set to music by Mik Davis) Attack Attack Records: 2012
 Crow (poetry set to music by Henning Nugel) Attack Attack Records: 2016

Audio books

 Stone Baby (2000)
 Billie Morgan (2005)
 The Accidental (written by Ali Smith; audio recording by Joolz Denby)

See also

Punk literature
New Model Army

References

External links
 
 Part of a New Model Army discography site, an illustrated list of spoken word recordings and the first two Red Sky Coven volumes; it excludes Denby's audio book work

Living people
1955 births
English women poets
Writers from Bradford
English women novelists
Spoken word poets
People educated at Harrogate Ladies' College
20th-century English women
20th-century English people
21st-century English women
21st-century English people